Stono Mountain is a summit in St. Francois County in the U.S. state of Missouri. Mineral City lies along the headwaters of Doe Run Creek just to the east on Missouri Route W and Little Stono Mountain lies to the north.

Stono Mountain possibly takes its name from the Stono River in South Carolina, although folk etymology maintains stones in the area caused the name to be selected.

See also

 List of mountain peaks of Missouri

References

Mountains of St. Francois County, Missouri
Mountains of Missouri